The 1980 New Zealand tour of Wales was a collection of friendly rugby union games undertaken by the New Zealand All Blacks against Wales that also took in two international games in North America en route to South Wales. This was a single test tour against each of the countries played, with four games against Welsh club opposition.

Although the games were played within a tight schedule, the All Blacks were victorious in all seven matches. New Zealand scored 32 tries for and only conceding 2 against, for a total points tally of 197 to 41 over the entire tour.

Results

Touring party

Manager: R.A. Harper
Assistant Manager: Eric Watson
Captain: Graham Mourie (Taranaki)

Full-backs
Brett Codlin (Counties)
Doug Rollerson (Manawatu)

Three-quarters
Bernie Fraser (Wellington)
Bruce Robertson (Counties)
Stu Wilson (Wellington)
Fred Woodman (North Auckland)

Five-eighths
Nicky Allen (Counties)
Bill Osborne (Wanganui)
Murray Taylor (Waikato)

Half-backs
Mark Donaldson (Manawatu)
Dave Loveridge (Taranaki)

Forwards
John Ashworth (Canterbury)
Andy Dalton (Counties)
Andy Haden (Auckland)
Graeme Higginson (Canterbury)
Geoff Hines (Waikato)
Rod Ketels (Counties)
Gary Knight (Manawatu)
Murray Mexted (Wellington)
Graham Mourie (Taranaki)
Geoff Old (Manawatu)
Frank Oliver (Manawatu)
Hika Reid (Bay of Plenty)
Mark Shaw (Manawatu)
John Spiers (Counties)

The matches

United States

Canada

Cardiff RFC

Llanelli RFC

Like the game played three days earlier against Cardiff, Llanelli proved tough opposition for the touring New Zealand side. Of the seven games played during the tour this was the closest in score, with only a six-point margin and at half time Llanelli were actually 10–3 ahead.

This match is often remembered for a controversial refereeing decision by Scottish referee Alan Hosie. Towards the end of the game, with the match still in the balance, Hosie appeared to send off the All Black lock, Graeme Higginson, only for a group of Llanelli players, led by Phil Bennett to challenge the referee over the action. Higginson was allowed to stay on the field with Hosie stating later that there was no sending off, and he had only giving Higginson a warning.

Swansea RFC

Newport RFC

Wales

The All Blacks returned to the Cardiff Arms Park in the final game of the tour and quickly showed a dominance of the game that
would continue until the final whistle. The fact that roughly 85% of the match was played in the Welsh half of the field correlates with the final score and the four tries from New Zealand that were without a Welsh reply. The defeat would have been far heavier, but Rollerson managed to convert only three of nine attempts at goal.

From this match only three Welsh players emerged with any credit. Full back J.P.R. Williams, scrum half Terry Holmes and on the wing 19-year-old Robert Ackerman, whose excellent covering play of Stu Wilson earned him a standing ovation when he left the field with an injury before the final whistle.

References

1980
1980
1980
1980
1980
1980 in New Zealand rugby union
1980–81 in Welsh rugby union
1980–81 in European rugby union
1980 in Canadian rugby union

it:Tour della Nazionale di rugby a 15 della Nuova Zelanda 1980